A benefit society, fraternal benefit society, fraternal benefit order, friendly society, or mutual aid society is a society, an organization or a voluntary association formed to provide mutual aid, benefit, for instance insurance for relief from sundry difficulties. Such organizations may be formally organized with charters and established customs, or may arise ad hoc to meet unique needs of a particular time and place.

Many major financial institutions existing today, particularly some insurance companies, mutual savings banks, and credit unions, trace their origins back to benefit societies, as can many modern fraternal organizations and fraternal orders which are now viewed as being primarily social. The modern legal system essentially requires all such organizations of appreciable size to incorporate as one of these forms or another to continue to exist on an ongoing basis.

Benefit societies may be organized around a shared ethnic background, religion, occupation, geographical region or other basis. Benefits may include financial security and/or assistance for education, unemployment, birth of a baby, sickness and medical expenses, retirement and funerals. Often benefit societies provide a social or educational framework for members and their families to support each other and contribute to the wider community.

Examples of benefit societies include trade unions, burial societies, friendly societies, cooperatives, credit unions, self-help groups, landsmanshaftn, immigrant hometown societies, fraternal organizations built upon the models of fraternal orders such as the Freemasons and the Oddfellows, some coworking communities, and many others.

A benefit society can be characterized by 
 members having equivalent opportunity for a say in the organization
 members having potentially equivalent benefits
 aid going to those in need (strong helping the weak)
 a collection fund for payment of benefits
 educating others about a group's interest
 preserving cultural traditions
 mutual deference

History of benefit societies

Examples of benefit societies can be found throughout history, including among secret societies of the Tang Dynasty in China and among African-Americans during the post-revolutionary years, such as those who organized the Free African Society of Philadedelphia.

Philadelphia's first black organization, the Free African Society was established in 1787 by two African American former slaves, Absalom Jones and Richard Allen. These two men were Methodist converts from evangelical masters, who gave these men permission to purchase their freedom in the early 1780s.

Mutual aid was a foundation of social welfare in the United States until the early 20th Century. Early societies not only shared material resources, but often advanced social values related to self-reliance and moral character. Many fraternal organizations were first organized as mutual aid societies when government at the state and local level supplemented private aid societies more than the converse of this being true. In 1890, 112,000 American residents lived in private charitable institutions, while only 73,000 resided in public almshouses. Towards the latter part of the nineteenth century, public aid was reduced as it was seen as contributing to sloth and dependency while private aid was judiciously provided with greater checks for reform and recovery. Writing in 1890, Jacob Riis, commenting on the extent of private charity, says: "New York is, I firmly believe, the most charitable city in the world. Nowhere is there so eager a readiness to help ..."

Medieval guilds were an early basis for many Western benefit societies. A guild charter document from 1200 states:

 "To become a gildsman,..it was necessary to pay certain initiation fees,..(and to take) an oath of fealty to the fraternity, swearing to observe its laws, to uphold its privileges, not to divulge its counsels, to obey its officers, and not to aid any non-gildsman under cover of the newly-acquired 'freedom.'" (C Gross, The Gild Merchant, (1927))

This charter shows the importance of 'brotherhood', and the principles of discipline, conviviality and benevolence. The structure of fraternity in the guild forms the basis for orders such as Freemasonry and other fraternal orders, friendly societies and modern trade unions. Joining such an organisation a member gained the 'freedom' of the craft, and the exclusive benefits that the organisation could confer on members.

Historically, benefit societies have emphasised the importance of social discipline, in conforming to the rules of the organisation and society, and acting in a morally uplifting and ethical manner. Conviviality and benevolence are important principles. Fraternal societies differed from public and private hierarchical aid organizations by employing an "ethical principle of reciprocity." This removed the stigma of charity.

During the eighteenth and nineteenth centuries benefit societies in the form of friendly societies and trade unions were essential in providing social assistance for sickness and unemployment, and improving social conditions for a large part of the working population. With the introduction in the early twentieth century of state social welfare programs, and industrial, health and welfare regulation, the influence and membership of benefit societies have declined in importance, but remains significant. Nevertheless, in many countries, for example in Europe, mutual benefit societies continue to provide statutory and supplementary healthcare coverage.

Peter Kropotkin posited early in the 20th century that mutual aid affiliations predate human culture and are as much a factor in evolution as is the "survival of the fittest" concept.

Oaths, secret signs and knowledge, and regalia were historically an important part of many benefit societies, but declined in use in most benefit societies during the late nineteenth and early twentieth centuries. Conversely, signs and ceremony have become the mainstay of fraternal societies that no longer focus as much on mutual aid.

Current benefit societies

Many of the features of benefit organizations today have been assimilated into organizations that rely on the corporate and political structures of our time. Insurance companies, religious charities, credit unions and democratic governments now perform many of the same functions that were once the purview of ethnically- or culturally-affiliated mutual benefit associations.

New technologies have provided yet more new opportunities for humanity to support itself through mutual aid. Recent authors have described the networked affiliations that produce collaborative projects.  In modern Asia rotating credit associations organized within communities or workplaces were widespread through the early twentieth century and continue in our time. Habitat for Humanity in the United States is a leading example of shared credit and labor pooled to help low-income people afford adequate housing.

In post-disaster reactions, formal benefit societies of our time often lend aid to others outside their immediate membership, while ad hoc benefit associations form among neighbors or refugees, generally lasting only as long as the emergency exists. Ad hoc mutual aid associations have been seen organized among strangers facing shared challenges in such disparate settings as the Woodstock Music and Arts Festival in New York in 1969, during the Beijing Tiananmen square protests of 1989, for neighborhood defense during the Los Angeles Riots of 1992, and work of the organization Common Ground Collective which formed in New Orleans after Hurricane Katrina in 2005. The Rainbow Family organizes gatherings in National Forests of the United States each year around age old models of ad hoc mutual aid.

North America 

Benefit societies, fraternal benefit societies or "fraternals" are not-for-profit membership organizations that have a representative form of government and are organized through a lodge system, commonly represented in the societies of North America. to carry out social, intellectual, educational, charitable, benevolent, moral, fraternal, patriotic or religious purposes. "Fraternals" provide members with life insurance and other financial protection benefits in accordance with state law and use the earnings to fund member-supported community activities. Fraternals are chartered by state law and have been exempt from income tax under Section 501(c)(8) of the United States Tax Code since 1909.

History
Fraternal Benefit Societies trace their lineage back through mutual societies, friendly societies and eventually to medieval guilds.
Many fraternal benefit societies were founded to serve the needs of immigrants and other under-served groups who shared common bonds of religion, ethnicity, gender, occupation or shared values. The first modern American fraternal benefit society was the Ancient Order of United Workmen, founded by John J. Upchurch in 1868.
"The Order of Knights of Pythias is a great international fraternity which was founded in Washington, DC, February 19, 1864, by Justus H. Rathbone..." The Knights had an "Endowment Rank" which included life, health and disability insurance.

As Walter Bayse wrote in his history of fraternals:

Structure

Model Fraternal Code
The Model Fraternal Code which has been adopted in some form by most states defines fraternals as follows:

National Union v. Marlow
The court's opinion in National Union v. Marlow is considered to be the leading judicial pronouncement of what constitutes a fraternal society. 

As indicated in this case, a fraternal benefit society is required to have a "common bond" among its members. Further, a society is required to specify in its laws the eligibility standards for membership, as well as classes of membership, the process of admission, and the rights and privileges of members.

A fraternal benefit society is operating under a lodge system if it has a supreme governing body and subordinate lodges into which members are elected, initiated or admitted in accordance with its laws. 
A society has a representative form of government if its supreme governing body is an assembly composed of delegates elected directly by members or intermediate assemblies, or a board similarly elected.

Fraternal benefit societies provide insurance benefits to their members including life insurance and endowments, annuities, disability, hospital, medical and nursing benefits, and such other benefits authorized for life insurers that are not inconsistent with the general fraternal laws.

21st century
In the 21st century, fraternal benefit societies remain active in the United States. In addition to the mutual benefits provided to members, many fraternal benefit societies engage in charitable and volunteer efforts of lodge members in the broader community. There are more than 80 fraternal benefit societies operating in the United States and Canada today, with over 9 million members and with $380 billion of life insurance in force.

Select past and present benefit societies

 Catholic Financial Life
 Canadian Fraternal Association
Free African Union Society, Newport, Rhode Island
 Independent Order of Foresters
 Gleaner Life Insurance Society
 Knights of Pythias
 Knights of Columbus
 Knights of Peter Claver
 Mosaic Templars of America
 Modern Woodmen of America
 Woodmen of the World
 Thrivent Financial
 Royal Neighbors of America
 Umberto Primo Society
 Sons of Norway
 Vasa Order of America
 Odd Fellows
 Teachers Life
 International Order of Twelve Knights and Daughters of Tabor
 Faith Life
 Order of Chosen Friends
 The National Grange of the Order of Patrons of Husbandry
 Order of United Commercial Travelers of America

See also 
 Fraternity
 Fraternal order
Health care sharing ministry

Notes

References
 Kropotkin, Peter (1902) Mutual Aid: A Factor of Evolution
 
 Beito, David T. (2000) From Mutual Aid to Welfare State: How Fraternal Societies Fought Poverty and Taught Character
 Beito, David T.; Gordon, Peter; Tabarrok, Alexander eds. (2002) The Voluntary City: Choice, Community, and Civil Society
 Barber, Benjamin (2002) "Mutual Aid Society on a Grand Scale"
 

he:גמילות חסדים